The RV  Barbaros Hayreddin Paşa is a Turkish seismographic research/survey vessel owned and operated by the Turkish Petroleum Corp. (TPAO). Built in Dubai, United Arab Emirates (UAE) and launched in 2011, she was purchased in 2013 and renamed in honor of the renowned Ottoman Navy admiral Barbarossa Hayreddin Pasha (1478–1546).

History 
The ship was built at Drydocks World Dubai for Polarcus, a Dubai-based marine geophysical company in the UAE. She was launched on 16 February 2011 joining the company's same class fleet as the fourth vessel, and was christened Polarcus Samur for Arabic female given name meaning "swift, fleet". She was delivered on 2 March 2011, commissioned under the flag of the Bahamas and sailed to its first mission to serve for Namibia in charter.

The ship was acquired in December 2012 by the Turkish state-owned oil and gas company TPAO to an amount of US$130 million for use in marine seismographic surveys, Minister of Energy and Natural Resources Taner Yıldız said on 30 January 2013. The sale includes a collaboration arrangement with Polarcus company for support service in seismic data acquisition, fast-track data processing, management and crewing for the vessel over a three-year period. After repainted in red and white at Desan Shipyard in Tuzla, Istanbul, reflagged and renamed to Barbaros Hayreddin Paşa, she was commissioned on 23 February 2013 by Prime Minister Recep Tayyip Erdoğan. In the beginning, she will operate in a region around  far from Bosporus in western Black Sea. Later, she will continue with surveys in the Mediterranean Sea for oil and gas field exploration.

Characteristics 
She is an Arctic-ready with an ICE-1A class notation and environment-friendly high-tech vessel, built using Norwegian Ulstein SX133 X-bow innovative vessel design, which reduces fuel consumption and enables improved transit speeds at minimum emissions. The vessel also consists of most technologically advanced seismic and navigation systems available.

She obtains 2D and 3D data. The ship has also a helideck for use with a Sikorsky S-92 helicopter on board.

Ship's register 
 2011 ex Polarcus Samur, built for Polarcus DMCC,
 2013 Barbaros Hayreddin Paşa, purchased by the Turkish Petroleum Corp. (TPAO).

Sister ship 
  RV Vyacheslav Tikhonov, ex RV Polarcus Selma

See also 
 List of research vessels of Turkey

References 

Research vessels of Turkey
2011 ships
Ships built in the United Arab Emirates